The Captain is the solo debut album of Australian country music singer Kasey Chambers. The Captain won the 1999 ARIA Music Award for Best Country Album. Prior to releasing this album, Chambers had performed more than a decade with her family's Dead Ringer Band, a popular Australian country music group.  The title track was featured in "He Is Risen", an episode of The Sopranos, while "The Hard Way" was featured in the season 2 episode of Lost, "Two for the Road".

The album has been certified 3× platinum in Australia.

Track listing

Charts

Weekly charts

Year-end charts

Certifications

References

1999 debut albums
ARIA Award-winning albums
Kasey Chambers albums
Asylum Records albums